The Conroy Baronetcy, of Llanbrynmair in the historic County of Montgomery, Wales, was a title in the Baronetage of the United Kingdom.

The title was created on 7 July 1837 for Sir John Conroy, Comptroller of the household of the Duchess of Kent, mother of Queen Victoria. Victoria had previously dismissed Conroy from her household and the baronetcy was conferred on him with the understanding that he would not show himself at court in return. The title became extinct on the death of the third Baronet in 1900.

Conroy baronets (1837)
Sir John Conroy, 1st Baronet (1786–1854)
Sir Edward Conroy, 2nd Baronet (1809–1869)
Sir John Conroy, 3rd Baronet (1845–1900)

Patrilineal Descent

The Conroys descended from the Ó Maolconaire family of Elphin, Co.Roscommon. The family had been the hereditary Ollamhs to the O'Connor Kings of Connacht. Their line was descended from Maoilin Ó Maolchonaire who was the last recognised Chief of the Sept.

Torna Mór Ó Maolchonaire, Chief of the Sept, d. 1435
Seán Rua Ó Maolchonaire
Domhnall Rua Ó Maolchonaire, d. 1504
Conchobhar Ó Maolchonaire, Chief of the Sept, d. 1533
Maolmhuire Ó Maolchonaire, Chief of the Sept
Maoilin Ó Maolchonaire, Last Chief of the Sept, d. 1637
Torna Ó Maolchonaire
Seán Ó Maolchonaire, d. 1672 (while fighting for the French during the Franco-Dutch War)
Ferfeasa Conry, d. 1746 (first of this line to convert from Catholicism to Protestantism)
John Conry of Elphin, d. 1769
John Conry, d. 1795
Sir John Ponsonby Conroy, 1st Baronet (1786 -1854)
Sir Edward Conroy, 2nd Baronet (1809-1869)
Sir John Conroy, 3rd Baronet (1845-1900)

References

1837 establishments in the United Kingdom
1837 in Wales
1900 disestablishments in the United Kingdom
Conroy
History of Montgomeryshire